"Sweet Love" is the second single from Australian supergroup Company of Strangers. The track was released on November 1992 and peaked at number 21 in December. It features the vocals of James Reyne and backing vocals by Daryl Braithwaite

Track listings
 CD Single
 "Sweet Love" - 4:37
 "Should've Known Better" / "Very Light Hell" - 8:11

Chart positions

Weekly charts

External links

References

1992 songs
1992 singles
Columbia Records singles
Company of Strangers (band) songs
Songs written by Simon Hussey